Christian Schmidt may refer to:

 Christian Schmidt (footballer) (1888–1917), German footballer
 Christian Schmidt (politician) (born 1957), German politician
 Christian Schmidt (Klopfer) (born 1980), German writer and editor
 Christian Schmidt (actor), German actor